Kellokoski is one of the three villages in the Finnish municipality of Tuusula. Kellokoski has a population of 4,400.

Kellokoski has its own church, which was built in 1734, and a psychiatric hospital.

Most people speak Finnish. Earlier there were also people who spoke Swedish.

History
Kellokosken ruukki, pig iron factory started 1795. Nowadays, iron products have been replaced with products made from aluminium.

Notable people from Kellokoski
Antti Nykänen, basketball player

References 

Tuusula
Villages in Finland